Roque Germán Olsen Fontana (9 September 1925 – 15 June 1992), commonly known as Roque Olsen, was an Argentine football player and manager.

Playing career
Olsen started his playing career in the local leagues of Parana, Entre Ríos. In 1949 he was signed by Tigre, the following year he joined champions Racing Club de Avellaneda. After playing 15 games for Racing Club, he joined Real Madrid where he went on to become one of the club's most important goal scorers. He played out his career with Córdoba CF in the late 1950s.

Managerial career
Olsen started his managerial career with Córdoba CF leading them to promotion to La Liga in 1962. He then managed Deportivo La Coruña, Real Zaragoza and FC Barcelona. He also managed Elche CF, Sevilla FC and Celta Vigo. His last managerial position before his death in 1992 was as manager of UD Las Palmas.

References

External links
Official Manager's Profile from www.fcbarcelona.com
Sauce de Luna profile 

1925 births
1992 deaths
Sportspeople from Entre Ríos Province
Argentine footballers
Argentine people of Danish descent
Club Atlético Tigre footballers
Racing Club de Avellaneda footballers
Real Madrid CF players
Córdoba CF players
Expatriate footballers in Spain
Argentine football managers
Argentine expatriate football managers
Córdoba CF managers
Deportivo de La Coruña managers
Real Zaragoza managers
FC Barcelona managers
RC Celta de Vigo managers
Elche CF managers
Sevilla FC managers
UD Las Palmas managers
Cádiz CF managers
Recreativo de Huelva managers
Argentine people of Scandinavian descent
Expatriate football managers in Spain
Association football forwards